Suraj Prakash (Gurmukhi: ਸੂਰਜ ਪ੍ਰਕਾਸ਼ lit. "The Light of the Sun"), also called Gur Partap Suraj Granth (Gurmukhi: ਗੁਰ ਪ੍ਰਤਾਪ ਸੂਰਜ ਗ੍ਰੰਥ), is a popular and monumental hagiographic text about Sikh Gurus written by Kavi Santokh Singh (1787–1843) and published in 1843 CE. It consists of life legends performed by Sikh Gurus and historic Sikhs such as Baba Banda Bahadur in 51,820 verses. According to Pashaura Singh – a scholar of Sikhism, the text freely borrows from prior mythical stories in Janamsakshis and older Sikh literature such as Bansavalinama, Sikhan di Bhagat Mala, and Mahima Prakash, then embellishes it further. 

The Suraj Prakash is written in Braj Bhasha language in Gurmukhi script, with significant use of Sanskrit words. It is organized into "seasons" and "rays". It includes Vedantic doctrines of Udasi Sikhs and Nirmala Sikhs. The text also incorporates some ideas of the Hindalis considered heretical by Khalsa Sikhs. This, states Pashaura Singh, may have been the result of the traditional Sikh schools in Amritsar of 18th– and 19th–century which included Vedanta as a standard part of the Sikh learning.

According to W. H. McLeod – a historian and Sikhism scholar, the Suraj Prakash contains "somewhat higher proportion" of Sikh history, but it is mostly ahistorical mythology and untrustworthy source of Sikh history. Max Arthur Macauliffe extensively but selectively used the Suraj Prakash, in cooperation with Kahn Singh Nabha, for his six-volume The Sikh Religion series that presented Sikh scriptures and history to the Western world in early 20th-century. While Macauliffe used it extensively in his Sikh Gurus and history sections, he added that the Suraj Prakash is of doubtful trustworthiness, because the education and heritage of its author Santokh Singh was "largely tinctured with Hinduism".

Suraj Parkash is a popular text in the Sikh community, profusely poetic, and it is sometimes recited in a katha form. 

The text is a sequel to Santokh Singh's Guru Nanak Prakash, describing the life of the first Guru in 9,700 verses. The lives of the Gurus, are divided into twelve Raas or sections. The life of the tenth Guru is presented in six Ruts (literally six seasons), and into two Ayans, the ascending and descending phases of the year. Suraj Parkash was first edited by Bhai Vir Singh over 1926-1935 in 14 volumes, with Punjabi footnotes.

Author 

Suraj Prakash was written by Kavi Santokh Singh.

Bibliography 

 Naam Kosh (1819) - a translation of the Sanskrit dictionary, Amar Kosa, into Braj
 Maha Kav (meaning "Great Composition of Poetry") (1821)
 Garab Ganjani Teeka (1829) - a translation of the Japji Sahib written in the Sadhukari-language
 Balmiki Ramyan (1834) - a translation of the Valmiki Ramayana into the Braj-language
 Upanishads translation
 Vedant Shastras translation
 Atam Purayan Teeka
 Guru Nanak Parkash (1823) - hagiographic text about Guru Nanak
 Gur Partap Suraj Granth (Suraj Prakash) (1843) - hagiographic text about all the Sikh Gurus

See also
 Panth Parkash

References

External links
 Bhai Daya Singh Library

Indian biographies
Indian poetry
Sikh mass media
Sikh literature